John McVie's "Gotta Band" with Lola Thomas is an album by the British Fleetwood Mac bassist John McVie, released in 1992. American singer Lola Thomas provided vocals throughout, backed by McVie and a crew of session musicians including Fleetwood Mac guitarist Billy Burnette and former Rolling Stone Mick Taylor.

Track listing
 "Evidence" (Gregg Sutton, John Herron, Bob Pfeifer) – 3:48
 "Now I Know" (Dennis Morgan, David Malloy, Billy Burnette) – 4:06
 "Lost What You Had" (Lola Thomas) – 3:31
 "Shot Down by Love" (Sutton, Sam Brown)  – 3:59
 "Step Aside" (David Plenn, Dennis Walker) – 3:51
 "You Left Me Lonely" (Thomas, Walker) – 5:14
 "The Bigger the Love" (Burnette, Larry Henley, Larry Keith) – 3:49
 "All That I Was Guilty Of..." (Thomas, Sutton) – 3:25
 "One More Time with Feeling" (Thomas) – 4:56
 "The Way I Do" (Thomas) – 3:40

Personnel
John McVie – bass guitar, backing vocals
Lola Thomas – vocals
Mick Taylor – guitar
Billy Burnette – guitar, backing vocals
David Plenn – guitar
Jim Pugh – piano, Hammond organ
Wayne Jackson & Andrew Love – The Memphis Horns
Lee Spath – drums
Brad Dutz – percussion
George Hawkins – backing vocals

Production 
Produced by Dennis Walker
Executive producer – John McVie
Second Engineer/Sound City – Jack Hayback
Mastered by Bernie Grundman
Management – Steve Wax/Garry C. Keif/Stiletto Management
Photography – Mark Hanauer
Design – Jeri Heiden
Recorded at Sound City, Sunnyside Studios, and Paramount Studios, Los Angeles; and Fantasy Studios and Studio "D" Recording, San Francisco. Mixed at Ardent Studios, Memphis, by John Hampton, assisted by G.E. Teel.

References

1992 albums